Aapo Johannes Hyvärinen (born 1970 in Helsinki) is a Finnish professor of computer science at the University of Helsinki and known for his research in independent component analysis.

Education and career 
Hyvärinen was born in Helsinki and studied mathematics at the University of Helsinki and received his Doctor of Technology in information science in 1997 at the Helsinki University of Technology under the supervision of Erkki Oja. His doctoral thesis is titled Independent component analysis: A neural network approach. Since then, Hyvärinen has conducted research especially in relation to the independent component analysis. In November 2007, he was appointed as a professor at the University of Helsinki. Hyvärinen has been a member of the Finnish Academy of Sciences since 2016. From August 2016 to March 2019, he held a professorship in machine learning at the Gatsby Computational Neuroscience Unit of the University College London.

Bibliography

References 

Living people

1970 births
People from Helsinki
Finnish computer scientists
Machine learning researchers
Academics of University College London
University of Helsinki alumni
Aalto University alumni
Academic staff of the University of Helsinki